Miškovice is a cadastral area in Prague, Czech Republic.

References

Districts of Prague